Steven D. Poulin (born January 1, 1962) is a United States Coast Guard admiral who serves as the 33rd Vice Commandant of the Coast Guard since May 31, 2022. He most recently served as commander of the Coast Guard Atlantic Area and Coast Guard Defense Force East from 2020 to 2022. As Atlantic Area commander, he had operational control over Coast Guard missions covering the Rocky Mountains to the Arabian Gulf, covering 5 Coast Guard districts and 40 states. He previously served as director of operations for the United States Southern Command, commander of the Coast Guard First District, and Judge Advocate General and Chief Counsel of the Coast Guard.

In April 2022, Poulin was nominated for promotion to admiral and assignment as vice commandant of the Coast Guard, succeeding Linda L. Fagan. His nomination was sent to the United States Senate on April 7, 2022 and he was confirmed on May 11.

Awards and decorations

References

|-

Living people
People from Kittery, Maine
Military personnel from Maine
United States Army War College alumni
United States Coast Guard Academy alumni
George Washington University alumni
Recipients of the Coast Guard Distinguished Service Medal
Recipients of the Defense Superior Service Medal
Recipients of the Legion of Merit
United States Coast Guard admirals
1962 births
Vice Commandants of the United States Coast Guard
Biden administration personnel